Helmar Lerski (18 February 1871, in Strasbourg – 19 September 1956, in Zürich) was a photographer who laid some of the important foundations of modern photography. His works are on display in the USA, Germany, Israel and Switzerland. He focused mainly on portraits and the technique of photography with mirrors.

His real name was Israel Schmuklerski. In 1876, the family moved to Zürich, Switzerland, where the family was naturalized. In 1888, Lerski emigrated to the United States, where he worked as an actor. Around 1910, he began to photograph. In 1915, he returned to Europe and worked as a cameraman and expert for special effects for many films, including Fritz Lang's Metropolis. At the end of the 1920s, he made a name as an avant-garde portrait photographer.

In 1932, he emigrated with his second wife to Mandate Palestine, where he continued to work as a photographer, cameraman, and film director. On 22 March 1948, they left what was by then Israel and settled again in Zürich.

Photographic work
Series Köpfe des Alltags: 1928 - 1930, published 1931
Series Metamorphosen: 1936, published 1982

Selected filmography
 When the Dead Speak (1917)
 Maria Pavlowna (1919)
 Children of Darkness (1921)
 The False Dimitri (1922)
 A Dying Nation (1922)
 Inge Larsen (1923)
 The New Land (1924)
 The Wig (1925)
 The Holy Mountain (1926)
 Adamah (1948)

See also
Fred Dunkel

Publications
Lerski, H.: Köpfe des Alltags, Berlin: Verlag Hermann Rockendorf, 1931.
Ebner, F.: Metamorphosen des Gesichts. Die "Verwandlungen durch Licht" von Helmar Lerski. Steidl Verlag, Göttingen 2002. .
Eskildsen, U. (ed.); Lerski, H.: Verwandlungen durch Licht. Metamorphosis through Light,, Freren: Luca, 1982.
Eskildsen, U.; Horak, J.-C.: Helma Lerski, Lichtbildner. Fotografien und Filme 1910-1947, Folkwang Essen 1982.

External links

 
 
 
 
Helmar Lerski: Metamorphose, in German.
Museum Folkwang, Essen, Germany. In German.
Article about Metamorphosen, Art Magazin, 2002.
Some images from Köpfe des Alltags at the George Eastman House.
Loewy, R.: Adamah - Helmar Lerski's letzter Film. In German.
Exhibit in Museum of Art and Jewish History in Paris. in French and English.

1871 births
1956 deaths
Artists from Zürich
German emigrants to Switzerland
Israeli photographers
Swiss photographers
Swiss cinematographers
Early photographers in Palestine